Ilie Popa (July 20, 1907 – July 26, 1983) was a Romanian mathematician and Head of the Mathematical Analysis Department at the University of Iași. He is known for his contributions to differential geometry, mathematical analysis, and the history of mathematics.

Born in Iași, he attended the Costache Negruzzi High School in his native city. In 1927 he enrolled at the University of Iași, graduating in 1931. Upon graduation, he became an Assistant Professor at the Faculty of Science of the University of Iași and began his research activity under the guidance of his advisor, Alexander Myller. He obtained his Ph.D. in 1934 with thesis Contributions to Centro-Affine Differential Geometry, in which he pursued research themes of his two mentors, Myller and Octav Mayer. In 1936, the Romanian Academy awarded him a two-year scholarship to pursue his postdoctoral studies in Italy and Germany; during this period, he visited Enrico Bompiani at Sapienza University of Rome and Wilhelm Blaschke at the University of Hamburg. While away, he was promoted to Associate Professor in the Department of Higher Algebra at the University of Iași. After a brief stint in 1942 at the Gheorghe Asachi Technical University of Iași, he returned to the University of Iași as Professor. In 1948 he became the Head of the Mathematical Analysis Department, a position that he held until his retirement in 1973. From 1944 to 1945 and again from 1965 to 1971 he was pro-rector of the University.

References

1907 births
1983 deaths
Scientists from Iași
Alexandru Ioan Cuza University alumni
Academic staff of Alexandru Ioan Cuza University
Romanian mathematicians
Historians of mathematics
Differential geometers
Mathematical analysts